The 2001 San Diego Padres season was the 33rd season in franchise history.

Offseason
November 3, 2000: Buddy Carlyle was purchased by Hanshin Tigers (Japan Central) from the San Diego Padres.
December 10, 2000: Ernie Young was signed as a free agent with the San Diego Padres.
December 15, 2000: Adam Riggs was signed as a free agent with the San Diego Padres.
 January 12, 2001: Heathcliff Slocumb was released by the San Diego Padres.
 March 19, 2001: Rickey Henderson signed as a free agent with the San Diego Padres.
 March 28, 2001: Mark Kotsay was traded by the Florida Marlins with Cesar Crespo to the San Diego Padres for Matt Clement, Eric Owens, and Omar Ortíz (minors).

Regular season

Rickey Henderson
 During the 2001 season, Rickey Henderson broke two major league records and reached a career milestone. He broke Babe Ruth's all-time record for walks, Ty Cobb's all-time record for runs (doing so with a home run), and on the final day of the season, he had his 3,000th career hit. That final game was also Padre legend Tony Gwynn's last major league game, and is the only time in Major League history in which two teammates had 3,000 hits each. Rickey had originally wanted to sit that game out so as not to detract from the occasion, but Gwynn insisted that Henderson play.

At the age of 42, his last substantial major league season, Henderson finished the year with 25 stolen bases, ninth in the NL. It also marked Rickey Henderson's 23rd consecutive season in which he'd stolen more than 20 bases.

Opening Day starters
 Chris Gomez – SS
 Mark Kotsay – CF
 Mike Darr – LF
 Ryan Klesko – 1B
 Tony Gwynn – RF
 Damian Jackson – 2B
 Ben Davis – C
 Phil Nevin – 3B
 Kevin Jarvis – SP

Season standings

Record vs. opponents

Notable transactions
July 30, 2001: Sterling Hitchcock was traded by the San Diego Padres to the New York Yankees for Brett Jodie and Darren Blakely (minors).

Roster

Player stats

Batting
Note: Pos = Position; G = Games played; AB = At bats; H = Hits; Avg. = Batting average; HR = Home runs; RBI = Runs batted in

Other batters
Note: G = Games played; AB = At bats; H = Hits; Avg. = Batting average; HR = Home runs; RBI = Runs batted in

Pitching

Starting pitchers
Note: G = Games pitched; IP = Innings pitched; W = Wins; L = Losses; ERA = Earned run average; SO = Strikeouts

Other pitchers
Note: G = Games pitched; IP = Innings pitched; W = Wins; L = Losses; ERA = Earned run average; SO = Strikeouts

Relief pitchers
Note: G = Games pitched; W = Wins; L = Losses; SV = Saves; ERA = Earned run average; SO = Strikeouts

Award winners

2001 Major League Baseball All-Star Game
 Ryan Klesko
 Phil Nevin

Farm system 

LEAGUE CO-CHAMPIONS: Lake Elsinore

References

External links
 2001 San Diego Padres at Baseball Reference
 2001 San Diego Padres at Baseball Almanac

 

San Diego Padres seasons
San Diego Padres Season, 2001
San Diego